The buff-throated woodcreeper (Xiphorhynchus guttatus) is a resident passerine bird found in tropical South America in the Guiana Shield and disjunctly in the northern Atlantic Forest. It formerly included the cocoa woodcreeper and the Lafresnaye's woodcreeper as subspecies. Some authorities retain Lafresnaye's position as a subspecies of the buff-throated woodcreeper, but the resulting group is polyphyletic (see Systematics and evolution).

Description

The head, neck, mantle and chest are streaked buff, and the rest of the upperparts, wings and tail are rufous. The underparts are olive-brown. The bill is long, slightly decurved, and hooked at the tip. The upper mandible is dark grey, while the lower mainly is pale greyish-horn. The normal call is a loud chev-re chev-re.

Ecology
Buff-throated woodcreepers are restricted to humid forest and woodland. The taxa in north-eastern South America (polystictus and connectens) are generally the commonest large woodcreeper within their range, but the nominate taxon (X. g. guttatus), which is restricted to humid tropical Atlantic forest, has a fragmented population and is generally uncommon. They are insectivores which feed on ants and other insects and spiders. It feeds low in trees, usually alone, but groups will follow columns of army ants. The species builds a bark-lined nest in a tree hole or hollow stump and lays two white eggs.

Systematics and evolution
The taxonomy is highly complex. The smaller cocoa woodcreeper (X. susurrans) from Central America and northwestern South America was formerly included in this species, but is now normally considered to be distinct. Of the remaining taxa, the pale-billed and buff-streaked guttatoides group (incl. dorbignyanus) and the dark-billed and whitish-streaked eytoni group (incl. vicinalis and gracilirostris) have often been considered separate species, as the Lafresnaye's woodcreeper (X. guttatoides) and the dusky-billed woodcreeper (X. eytoni). While visually very different, these two groups are now known to form a single cladeAleixo, Alexandre (2002b): Molecular Systematics and the Role of the "Várzea"-"Terra-Firme" Ecotone in the Diversification of Xiphorhynchus Woodcreepers (Aves: Dendrocolaptidae). Auk 119(3): 621-640. DOI: 10.1642/0004-8038(2002)119[0621:MSATRO]2.0.CO;2 HTML abstract (combined under a "broad" Lafresnaye's woodcreeper, X. guttatoides) separate from the nominate group (guttatus, polystictus and connectens) of X. guttatus, which instead is closer to X. susurrans. Biogeography and molecular data suggest that the relationship between these subspecies and the taxa now included in X. guttatoides and X. susurrans deserves further study. Depending on the outcome of these studies, the buff-throated woodcreeper could be restricted to the southern coastal population, which is endangered by habitat fragmentation, making a change in conservation status necessary.

The most likely evolutionary scenario is that from lower Amazonia, the ancestors of Lafresnaye's woodcreeper spread west- and southwestwards to the Andes, and those of the buff-throated and cocoa woodcreeper downriver and then along the coast of northern South America, where X. susurrans then branched off as the northern lineage. Indeed, it may be that the trans-Andean forms of the latter may constitute yet another good species, Lawrence's woodcreeper.

Subspecies
 X. g. guttatus (Lichtenstein, 1820). Coastal areas of Paraíba to Espírito Santo-Rio de Janeiro border.
 X. g. polystictus (Salvin & Goodman, 1883). Orinoco drainage from E Vichada Department northeastwards, via E Venezuela to the Guyanas.
 X. g. connectens Todd, 1948. N bank of lower Amazonas from E of Manaus to Amapá. Doubtfully distinct from polystictus.

References

Hilty, Steven L. (2003): Birds of Venezuela''. Christopher Helm, London. 

buff-throated woodcreeper
Birds of the Amazon Basin
Birds of the Atlantic Forest
Birds of the Guianas
buff-throated woodcreeper
Birds of Brazil